"The Voice of Charlie Pont" was an American television movie broadcast by the American Broadcasting Company on October 25, 1962, as part of the television series, Alcoa Premiere. It was written by Halstead Welles and directed by Robert Ellis Miller. The production received multiple Emmy Award nominations, including Program of the Year, Bradford Dillman for lead actor, Diana Hyland for lead actress, and Robert Redford for supporting actor.

Plot
Charlie Pont (played by Bradford Dillman) returns to Cambridge to visit college friends George Laurents (played by Robert Redford) and Liza Laurents (played by Diana Hyland).

Cast
The cast included performances by:

 Bradford Dillman as Charlie Pont
 Diana Hyland as Liza Laurents
 Robert Redford as George Laurents
 Bill Bixby as Brune
 Bob Hopkins as Truck Driver
 Cathie Merchant as Sheila
 Joey Russo as The Shine Boy
 Tammy Locke as Sally
 Ellen Madison as Susanna

The program was hosted by Fred Astaire.

Production
The production was broadcast by the American Broadcasting Company on October 25, 1962, as part of the television series, Alcoa Premiere. It was written by Halstead Welles based on a story by Douglas Fairbairn. Robert Ellis Miller was the director and Dick Berg the producer. John Williams composed the music.

The production received multiple Emmy Award nominations, including Program of the Year, Bradford Dillman for lead actor, Diana Hyland for lead actress, Robert Redford for supporting actor, Robert Ellis Miller for outstanding directorial achievement, and Halstead Welles for outstanding writing achievement.

References

1962 television films
1962 films
American television films